Daniel Farrand (September 9, 1760 – October 13, 1825) was a Vermont politician and lawyer who served as Speaker of the Vermont House of Representatives and a justice of the Vermont Supreme Court.

Biography
Daniel Farrand was born in Canaan, Connecticut on September 9, 1760.  He graduated from Yale University in 1781, studied law and moved to Vermont to establish a practice. Initially residing in Windsor, he subsequently moved to Newbury.

Farrand served in several local and county offices, including Orange County State's Attorney.  A Federalist, he served in the Vermont House of Representatives from 1792 to 1793 and 1796 to 1799.  From 1798 to 1799 he served as Speaker of the House.

Farrand moved to Rockingham in the early 1800s.  In addition to serving as Windham County State's Attorney he served in the Vermont House again from 1802 to 1803.  In 1802 he was an unsuccessful candidate for the United States House of Representatives, losing to James Elliott.

In 1813 Farrand served on the Vermont Council of Censors.  The same year he was also elected to the Vermont Supreme Court, serving to 1815.

After leaving the court Farrand moved to Burlington, where he continued to practice law.  In 1817 he was head of the welcoming committee that received President James Monroe during Monroe's tour of New England, and he delivered the welcoming address.

Farrand died in Burlington on October 13, 1825 and was buried in Elmwood Cemetery.

Stephen Jacob, who also served on the Vermont Supreme Court, was his brother-in-law.

References

1760 births
1825 deaths
People from Canaan, Connecticut
People from Windsor, Vermont
People from Newbury, Vermont
People from Windham County, Vermont
Politicians from Burlington, Vermont
Yale University alumni
Vermont lawyers
State's attorneys in Vermont
Vermont Federalists
Members of the Vermont House of Representatives
Speakers of the Vermont House of Representatives
Justices of the Vermont Supreme Court
Burials in Vermont
19th-century American lawyers